Toi Whakaari: NZ Drama School is New Zealand's national drama school. It was established in 1970 and is located in Wellington, New Zealand in the Te Whaea: National Dance & Drama Centre. Toi Whakaari offers training in acting, costume construction, set and props construction, performing arts management and design for stage and screen. Toi Whakaari has a roll of approximately 130 students annually, who study for up to three years.

Toi Whakaari is co-located at Te Whaea: National School of Dance and Drama with the New Zealand School of Dance which moved into the premises in 1998, at the same time as Toi Whakaari.

Name
Te Kura Toi Whakaari O Aotearoa: NZ Drama School is the official name of the school. The Māori portion of the name translates to: a place of learning (Te Kura), performing arts (Toi Whakaari), in (O) New Zealand (Aotearoa). This title was gifted to the School in 1988 by Te Puni Kokiri (Ministry for Māori Development) in recognition of the School's bicultural work.

History

Toi Whakaari was established in 1970 by the Queen Elizabeth II Arts Council, as the New Zealand Drama School, with Nola Leigh Millar as its first director.

In 2005, its first year students were the subjects of a reality TV show, Tough Act. 2010 saw Toi Whakaari celebrate its 40th Anniversary. This also coincided with a book launch of the school's history. The book, titled Transitions, was written by Bill Guest, former Head of the Entertainment Technology Programme and Associate Director.

Annie Ruth, one of the first acting graduates of the school, was Director of the school from 1998–2011 when she was succeeded by Christian Penny, who left in 2018 to take up a role with High Performance Sport NZ. In June 2019 it was announced that Tanea Heke (Ngā Puhi) would be the new Director, after six months as interim Director.

Notable alumni 

Tim Balme — actor, writer

Alice Canton— actor, director

Marton Csokas — screen actor

Miranda Harcourt — actor, director, coach

Tanea Heke — actor, director, Kaiwhakahaere

Ahilan Karunaharan — writer, director, actor

Francis Kora — musician, actor

Laughton Kora — musician, actor

Emily Perkins — novelist, playwright

Maaka Pohatu — actor, musician

Chelsie Preston Crayford — actor, filmmaker

Victor Roger — actor, playwright

Louise Sutherland — filmmaker

Alex Tarrant — screen actor

References

External links
 Toi Whakaari: NZ Drama School
 New Zealand School of Dance
 Tough Act Television Reality Series

Schools in Wellington City
Vocational education in New Zealand
Drama schools in New Zealand
1970 establishments in New Zealand
Education in Wellington